The Battle of Cowan's Ford was a battle in the Southern Theater of Cornwallis's 1780–1782 Campaign that eventually led to the British Army's surrender at Yorktown during the American Revolutionary War. It was fought on  February 1, 1781, at Cowan's ford on the Catawba River in northwestern Mecklenburg County, North Carolina, between a force of about 2,400 British and about 800 Whig militia who were attempting to slow the British advance across the river. The American general William Lee Davidson was killed in this battle.

Background
After the British victory at the Battle of Camden, General Nathanael Greene replaced Horatio Gates as Commander of the Southern Department of the Continental Army. Rather than attempt to confront the much larger and better equipped British Army under Cornwallis directly, Greene attempted to wear down his opponents by engaging the British in a series of small battles. Of these battles, Greene stated of the Continental Army: "We fight, get beat, rise, and fight again."

Following the Battle of Cowpens, Cornwallis was determined on destroying Greene's forces. Cornwallis ordered his men to burn their supplies and pursued Greene in the "Race to the Dan" (The Dan River which flows through Southern Virginia and Northern North Carolina).

During the preceding weeks, Cornwallis's army had swung to the left and approached the swollen waters of the Catawba in late January. For three days, the British forces camped at Ramsour's Mill, where they were joined by the remains of Banastre Tarleton forces.

On January 28, 1781, General Daniel Morgan reported to General Nathanael Greene from his camp in Sherrills Ford that his forces had observed the British army moving towards the Catawba River. Morgan reported that he was attempting to collect the militia and delay Cornwallis's forces from crossing the river. To this end, Morgan ordered General William Lee Davidson with 500 militia (two hundred and fifty of which were without flints for their muskets) to Beatties Ford.

Cornwallis marched his forces eastward toward the river to Jacob Forney's, where they camped for another three days after he had determined that the Catawba river at Beatties Ford was impassable because of the raging current.

Battle
On January 31, Cornwallis began to move his army despite the heavy rain fearing any further delay would cause him to lose his chance of destroying Greene's army. Some six weeks after the engagement, Cornwallis wrote that he had ordered a detachment under Lieutenant Colonel Webster to "make every possible demonstration by cannonading and otherwise, of an intention to force a passage" at Beatties Ford while he would march down the river to Cowan's Ford.

General Greene arrived and ordered General Davidson, who had placed his men at the various fords along the eastern bank, to slow the British Army's crossing of the Catawba River. Greene and Morgan then left to accompany the bulk of their forces towards Salisbury, North Carolina.

Davidson dispatched a company of cavalry and infantry southward four miles to Cowan's Ford. The cavalry was to see that the British did not make a surprise crossing under cover of darkness. Toward nightfall Davidson joined the detachment at Cowan's Ford. Davidson evidently feared that Tarleton's troops might slip across the river in the darkness and, getting behind him, they could attack him as the British infantry began its crossing. He therefore set up camp a half mile from the river, with pickets watching Cowan's Ford from the water's edge.

Near daybreak, after a difficult march in which the British lost some of their cannon, Cornwallis's army reached Cowan's Ford.  Cowan's Ford was actually two fords; one, the horse ford, though shallower than the other, was longer, because it crossed the stream at an angle; the other, called the wagon ford, went straight across the river but was much deeper. With very little hesitation, the British began crossing the swollen stream straight across along the wagon ford. Soon the horses were over their heads in the raging torrent.

Davidson's forces immediately began to confront the Redcoats. The militiamen were picking off many British soldiers as they struggled in the water to reach the far bank. After the first elements reached the bank and formed a firing line, they began to fire a volley at the now retreating militia. Shortly after arriving on the scene, Davidson was struck from his horse by a rifle ball through the heart. Oral tradition has it that a local Tory guide fired the fatal shot.

Late that evening Davidson's body was found, stripped and raindrenched. His wallet of papers, presumed taken by a British soldier, was discovered in the Public Records Office in London, in 1951. It was returned to the United States in 2001. General Davidson is buried at Hopewell Church in Mecklenburg county, NC.

Order of Battle

Patriots
The Patriots were commanded by Brigadier General (Pro Tempore) William Lee Davidson, who was killed in action.  Patriot units included the following:
Salisbury District Brigade of the North Carolina militia detachment led by Brigadier General (Pro Tempore) William Lee Davidson, with the following known units:
Mecklenburg County Regiment of the North Carolina militia detachment led by Lt. Col. William Polk, with ten (10) known companies, led by:
Capt. William Alexander
Capt. William Cole (from Randolph County)
Capt. Joseph Graham
Capt. Conrad Hise
Capt. James Huggins
Capt. James Ligert
Capt. Samuel Martin
Capt. James Maxwell
Capt. Charles Polk
Capt. Thomas Ray
Rowan County Regiment of the North Carolina militia detachment led by Maj. James Hall (killed), with thirteen known companies, led by:
Capt. Abel Armstrong
Capt. Daniel Bryson
Capt. David Caldwell
Capt. Thomas Cowan
Capt. James Crawford (mortally wounded)
Capt. Thomas Davidson
Capt. John Dickey
Capt. Richard Graham
Capt. Thomas Morrison
Capt. Jacob Nichols
Capt. Samuel Reid
Capt. Richard Simmons
Capt. William Wilson
Lincoln County Regiment of the North Carolina militia detachment led by Maj. David Wilson, with six known companies, led by:
Capt. John Baldridge
Capt. Peter Forney
Capt. Thomas Lofton
Capt. James Lytle
Capt. John Weir
Capt. John Work]
Surry County Regiment of the North Carolina militia detachment of two known companies, led by:
Capt. Arthur Scott
Capt. John Morgan
Burke County Regiment of the North Carolina militia detachment of one (known company, led by:
Capt. Alexander Irvin
Johnston County Regiment (New Bern District Brigade) of the North Carolina militia detachment of one known company, led by:
Capt. Thomas Culler
Montgomery County Regiment of the North Carolina militia detachment led by Col. William Lofton, with three known companies, led by:
Capt. John Hill (Randolph County)
Capt. Jonathan Potts (Mecklenburg County)
Capt. William Twitty (Rutherford County)
Orange County Regiment of the North Carolina militia detachment led by Lt. Col. Thomas Farmer and Maj. Archibald Murphy, with five known companies, led by:
Capt. William Greenwood
Capt. William Jamieson
Capt. Stephen Merritt (Granville County)
Capt. Shadrack Parish (Granville County)
Capt. William Nichols
Caswell County Regiment (Hillsborough District Brigade) of the North Carolina militia detachment of three known companies, led by:
Capt. Spillsby Coleman
Capt. F. Lawson
Capt. Robert Park
Wake County Regiment (Hillsborough District Brigade) of the North Carolina militia detachment of one known company, led by:
Capt. Etheldred Jones

British and loyalists
The British forces were commanded by Lt. General Charles, Lord Cornwallis.   The following units were under his command:

Brigade of Guards, led by Brig. Gen. Charles O'Hara, with 690 men in the following known units:
1st Guards Battalion, led by Col. Chapple Norton, with three companies, led by:
Lt. Col. Augustus Maitland - 1st Company
Lt. Col. Charles Horneck - 2nd Company
Lt. Col. Lowther Pennington - Grenadier Company
2nd Guards Battalion, led by Col. James Stewart, with two known companies, led by:
Lt. Col. Robert Lovelace - 3rd Company
Lt. Col. Thomas Swanton - 4th Company
Light Infantry, led by Col. Francis Hall, with three known companies, led by:
Lt. Col. Francis Hall - 3rd Scots Guards
Capt. William Maynard - Coldstream Guards
Lt. Col. Francis Dundas - 1st Guards
23rd Regiment of Foot (Royal Welsh Fusiliers), with 279 men in two known companies, led by:
Capt. Forbes Champagne
Capt. Thomas Peter
Hesse-Kassel Musketeer Regiment von Bose, led by Maj. Chris du Buy, with 345 men in four known companies, led by:
Capt. Alexander Wilmonsky
Capt. Moritz von Stein
Capt. Johann Eichenbrodt
Capt. Herman Christian Rall
British Legion, led by Unknown, with 180 men in two known companies, led by:
Capt. David Ogilvie
Capt. David Kinlock
Prince of Wales American Volunteers detachment of 10 men led by Ensign Patrick Garrett
Capt. Richard Hovenden
Capt. Thomas Sanford
Capt. Francis Gildart

References

Cowan's Ford
Mecklenburg County, North Carolina
Cowan's Ford
1781 in the United States
1781 in North Carolina
Conflicts in 1781